Friendship is an unincorporated community in Cherokee County, North Carolina.

History
A former variant name was "Suit". The local Suit family were the namesakes. A post office called Suit was established in 1886, and remained in operation until 1955.

References

Unincorporated communities in Cherokee County, North Carolina
Unincorporated communities in North Carolina